Yasuhiro Fueki (born 20 December 1985) is a Japanese track and field athlete who competes in the 400 metres hurdles. He is the 2013 Asian champion in the event.

Born in Chiba Prefecture he attended high school in Narita. He dipped under 51 seconds for the first time in 2006, running 50.73 seconds. He reduced this to 50.07 seconds the following season and was a semi-finalist at the 2007 Summer Universiade. He also placed third at the National Sports Festival of Japan that year. He did not compete in the hurdles again until 2011, when he returned to win the 400 m hurdles title at the Japanese Corporate Athletics Championships.

Marking a return to previous form, the 26-year-old ran a personal best of 49.71 seconds in 2011. He improved again to 49.31 seconds to take second at the 2013 Japan Championships in Athletics before going on to claim the gold medal at the 2013 Asian Athletics Championships.

Personal best

International competition

References

External links

Living people
1985 births
Japanese male hurdlers
Sportspeople from Chiba Prefecture
World Athletics Championships athletes for Japan
Competitors at the 2003 Summer Universiade